The Volvo LV120/130/140/150-series, or the Roundnose was a medium-size truck produced by Swedish automaker Volvo between 1939 and 1954.

History
The "Roundnose" was introduced in the autumn of 1939, in conjunction with the outbreak of the Second World War. The truck was originally built in three versions. The smallest LV120-series had the same side-valve engine as the Sharpnose. The larger LV125-series and the sturdier LV130-series had the same overhead valve engine as its predecessor LV90. During the war, many of these trucks were equipped with wood gas generators. 1944 saw the introduction of the LV140-series with the big FE engine which replaced the LV180/190-series.

In 1946 the Roundnose became the first Volvo truck offered with a diesel engine. The LV150-series was equipped with Volvo's VDA pre-chamber diesel engine.

All versions were updated in the early 1950s. The LV120-series became the L220-series with a stronger ED engine. The LV140-series became the L230-series, with an improved A6 engine and the LV150-series became the L245-series with a direct injected VDC diesel engine.

Engines

Gallery

References

External links 

 Volvo Trucks Global – history
 Swedish brass cars – picture gallery

Roundnose
Vehicles introduced in 1939